Dadhimati Mata Temple is a Hindu Temple of the goddess Dadhimati, located between the villages of Goth and Manglod in the Jayal tehsil of Nagaur district in Rajasthan, India. An inscription found there suggests that it existed at least as long ago at 608 CE.

It is an important site for the Dadheech Brahmins, and, as one of 52 shaktipiths, significant to the Shaktism tradition and to Purana-related scholarship.

Dadhimati is said to be the sister of the Rishi (sage) Dadhichi. The legend says she was born on magh (Indian month) shukl 7 (rath saptami) due to the churning of the sky. Dadhimati killed Detya Vikatasur on magh shukl 8 (jaya ashtami) in Dadhi Sagar. Dadhimati is the Avatar of the goddess Laxmi. The temple has the oldest depictions of 'Devi mahamatya', which are even older than the Mahalaxmi temple of Kolhapur, Maharashtra. It has a depiction of Valimiki ramyana in interiors.

References 

Hindu temples in Rajasthan
Temples in Rajasthan
Nagaur district